No. 59 Squadron was a squadron of the Royal Air Force, based in Norfolk, England.

History 

No.59 Squadron was formed at Narborough Airfield in Norfolk on 1 August 1916 as a squadron of the Royal Flying Corps. On 13 February 1917, the Squadron crossed the English Channel, deploying to Saint-Omer in northern France to operate in the army co-operation role, equipped with Royal Aircraft Factory R.E.8s.

During the Second World War it was attached to RAF Fighter Command (1937–1940), Bomber Command (taking part in the Millennium II raid on Bremen) and Coastal Command (1940–1945).  After the war, No 59 Squadron was attached to Transport Command, flying troops to India from September 1945 until 15 June 1946, when the squadron was disbanded.  On 1 December 1947 whilst at RAF Waterbeach, half the crew of No 51 Squadron were designated to reform as No 59 Squadron.  At 0800 the move from RAF Waterbeach to RAF Abingdon commenced whereupon the arrival of their commanding officer, Squadron Leader E.V Best A.F.C at 1000, the squadron officially reformed, as a Long Range Transport Unit flying Avro Yorks.  A detached flight would later take part in the Berlin Airlift (1948–49). The squadron disbanded again on 31 October 1950, then reformed at RAF Gutersloh, Germany in August 1956, when No. 102 Squadron was re-numbered No 59 Sqn flying English Electric Canberra B.2s and B(I).8s.  No 59 Squadron was last disbanded in 1961, when it was re-numbered to No.3 Squadron.

References 

 number59.com: No.59 Squadron RAF Historical and Memorial Site
 Royal Air Force:Historic Squadrons: 59 Squadron
 Air of Authority: No 56 - 60 Squadron Histories

External links

 Australian War Memorial 59 Squadron RAF- Roll of Honour

059 Squadron
059 Squadron
Military units and formations established in 1916
1916 establishments in the United Kingdom